The 2005 Aaron's 499 was the 9th race of the 2005 NASCAR Nextel Cup Series season, held on May 1, 2005, at Talladega Superspeedway in Lincoln, Alabama. The race was won by Jeff Gordon, who led 139 laps of the 194 lap race.

The race was extended from the scheduled 188 laps due to a late race caution.

Entry list

Qualifying

Race 
Outside pole sitter Jeff Gordon led the first lap of the race after he took the lead from pole sitter Kevin Harvick. The first caution flew on lap 20 when Kyle Petty blew a right front tire and hit the outside wall in the tri-oval. Gordon won the race off pit road and held onto the race lead on the restart. On lap 37, Tony Stewart took the lead from Gordon. On the same lap, the 2nd caution flew when Jeff Green blew a left-rear tire and spun out of turn 2. Jeff Gordon was the new race leader and led them to the restart on lap 42. On Lap 69, Kevin Harvick took the lead after restarting 37th due to problems with the nose of his car. Gordon took the lead back on lap 72 where green flag pitstops would begin. Harvick was the leader after everything cycled out on lap 75. On lap 79, Ryan Newman took the lead from Harvick. Jeff Gordon took the lead on lap 84 but was passed by Kevin Harvick the next lap. Dale Earnhardt Jr. soon took the lead on lap 89. Gordon took the lead from Earnhardt Jr. near the halfway mark on lap 92. After the longest green flag run of 61 laps, the 3rd caution flew on lap 102 when Bobby Hamilton Jr's tire blew and laid debris on the track. Scott Riggs won the race off pit road and was the new race leader and led them to the restart on lap 108. Riggs was immediately passed by Kevin Harvick for the lead. Gordon took the lead on lap 109 but was passed by Elliott Sadler on the next lap. On lap 116, Kyle Petty's car stalled on the front stretch bringing out the 4th caution of the race. Mark Martin won the race off pit road and led the field to the restart on lap 121. Martin was immediately passed by Jeff Gordon on the restart and Gordon took the lead. Elliott Sadler took the lead from Gordon on lap 124 but Gordon took it back two laps later.

On lap 133, the big one struck in turn one bringing out the 5th caution and took out a massive 26 cars. It started when Jimmie Johnson moved up and hit Mike Wallace in the left front sending Wallace up into Scott Riggs turning Wallace around and into the outside wall and taking out a lot more cars with him. The cars involved were Carl Edwards, Joe Nemechek, Jason Leffler, Ryan Newman, Dave Blaney, Ricky Rudd, Kasey Kahne, Mike Bliss, Rusty Wallace, Sterling Marlin, Bobby Labonte, Mike Wallace, Bobby Hamilton Jr, Scott Wimmer, Brian Vickers, Mark Martin, Matt Kenseth, Scott Riggs, Jimmie Johnson, Boris Said, Johnny Sauter, Kyle Busch, Mike Skinner, Kerry Earnhardt, Casey Mears, and Jeff Green. The race was red flagged for a short bit to clean up the mess. The race eventually got back under way with 51 laps to go with Jimmie Johnson as the new race leader. Jeff Gordon too the lead with 46 laps to.

Final Laps 
With 23 laps to go, the 6th caution flew for debris at pit entry. Gordon won the race off pit road and led the field back to green with 18 to go. But on the restart, Hermie Sadler's car stalled and sat there on the apron of the frontstretch. The caution eventually flew for this with 17 to go. The race got back going with 14 laps to go with Gordon leading. With 6 laps to go, Michael Waltrip took the lead from Gordon but Gordon took it back with 4 to go. But with 2 laps to go, a multi-car wreck occurred on the backstretch. It started when Jimmie Johnson hit the wall off of turn 2 and Johnson turned down into Kevin Harvick sending Harvick into Dale Earnhardt Jr. and turning Jr. around along with Martin Truex Jr. while also collecting Greg Biffle and Travis Kvapil. The caution was the 8th and final caution of the race and set up and green-white-checkered finish. Gordon led on the restart and held off the pack in the last two laps to win his 2nd Aaron's 499 in a row. Tony Stewart, Michael Waltrip, Jeremy Mayfield, and Jamie McMurray rounded out the top 5 while Elliott Sadler, Kurt Busch, Ken Schrader, Dale Jarrett, and Jeff Burton rounded out the top 10.

Results

References 

NASCAR
Sports competitions in Alabama